Satyavrata Tirtha (died 1638) was a Hindu philosopher, yogi, mystic, scholar and saint. He served as the pontiff of Shri Uttaradi Math from 1635–1638. He was the 18th in succession from Madhvacharya. Satyavrata Tirtha ruled the pontificate with a remarkable distinction. His life was a saga of supreme spiritual achievements. He is a yogi of remarkable spiritual powers and a philosopher of wide fame.

Works
Satyavrata Tirtha authored some works consisting of gloss, commentaries on the works of Jayatirtha, Vyasatirtha and a few hymns. Satyavrata Tirtha wrote a commentary on Nyaya Sudha of Jayatirtha called Sudha Vivruthi. His gloss on Nyayamrutha of Vyasatirtha is also most appreciated.

References

Bibliography
 

Indian Hindu saints
Madhva religious leaders
Dvaitin philosophers
Uttaradi Math
17th-century Indian philosophers